New-Gen, styled NEW-GEN, is a superhero comic book series created in 2008 by J.D. Matonti, Chris Matonti and Julia Coppola, of A.P.N.G. Enterprises. It is printed, distributed and advertised by Marvel Comics. The series centers on the war over nanotechnology between two powerful scientists, Gabriel and Deadalus, from the extra-dimensional world of New-Gen.

Publication history
New-Gen was launched by A.P.N.G. Enterprises and Issue 6 was published and distributed at New York Comic Con in Oct. 2010. The second volume of the comic, NEW-GEN: New Dawn, debuted at New York Comic Con in October 2011. NEW-GEN is printed, advertised, and distributed by Marvel Comics. Mark Hamill will lend his voice to characters in New-Gen's upcoming full-length featured film.

Plot
New-Gen is an extra-dimensional world where science and technology reign supreme. Nanotechnology controls a huge amount of the world's features, including weather, architecture, energy and materials science. The scientist Gabriel, pioneer in nanotechnology, strives for good and the betterment of his world through the use of his technology. However, his apprentice Deadalus, grows ruthless and seeks to use the nanobots to gain power and control over New-Gen.  Deadalus unleashes a powerful, unpredictable type of nanotechnology on the world, which infects several of the children of New-Gen, changing them into super-powered creatures. Gabriel defeats Deadalus and banishes him to the underworld. Gabriel then takes in all the children affected by his nanotechnology in order to protect and train them in the use of their powers, founding the Association for the Protection of the New Generation (A.P.N.G.) in the process. Fearing his infant twin sons, Chris and Sean, were affected, Gabriel sends them to Earth in present-day New York City to protect them from Deadalus, much to the dismay of his wife, Thea. While trapped in the underworld, Deadalus finds fierce robo-insectoid creatures called MetalMites that he can  mentally control. After discovering that the Mites can dig into other dimensions, he vows to get back to NEW-GEN and get revenge on Gabriel.

Years later, Deadalus escapes the underworld and begins wreaking havoc on ancient Crete. Gabriel sends the oldest and strongest member of the A.P.N.G., Mini, to dispatch Deadalus and his army of MetalMites. Mini battles the MetalMites, destroying many of them with his horns, but the fight becomes too much for him to handle alone. Gabriel sends the battle-robot, Horus, to help finish the fight against Deadalus and his creatures. When Mini and Horus have Deadalus beaten, Gabriel tells them to let him live, re-banishing Deadalus to the underworld. Throughout the battle, the native Cretans assume Mini is a sort of monster, which eventually leads to the Greek myth of the Minotaur.

Meanwhile, in present-day New York, Chris and Sean prepare to enter a new school in New York City. They are forced to deal with the pressures of fitting in, combined with a growing distance between them and their adoptive parents, and strange visions of Gabriel and Deadalus, of whom they know nothing. On New-Gen, Gabriel encounters challenges finding the best way of teaching the A.P.N.G.. Simultaneously, in the underworld, Deadalus discovers an enormous quantity of dormant microbots. The microbots respond and behave much like the nanobots he worked with on New-Gen. Deadalus plans to use the microbots to gain power over other worlds and dimensions. He infects himself with the microbots, much like he infected the children of New-Gen, in order to have them reconstruct his body and gain superhuman powers.

In the transformational process, Deadalus' physiology is drastically altered, coming to more closely resemble a demonic beast than a man. His mind is also altered, furthering his powerlust into genuine megalomaniac insanity. He adopts the identity of Sly, and sets his MetalMites to tunneling into a new world to conquer for his own. Additionally, he uses the microbots to upgrade the MetalMites, increasing their destructive power. Once Sly begins taking over the futuristic world of Nu-Mangi, Mini is sent in to stop him once again. However, Sly and his upgraded MetalMites prove far too powerful for Mini alone. The remaining members of the A.P.N.G., Flyer, Diamond, Gazelle, and Roboduck, join Mini for the battle. Meanwhile, on Earth, Sean begins having nightmares and visions of the battle, haunted in the night by the faces of Sly and the MetalMites

The battle rages on the surface of the new world, as the A.P.N.G. destroy wave after wave of MetalMites. Sean and Chris keep getting increasingly vivid glimpses of the battle while at school, but are clueless as to why they are being plagued by the visions. During a lull in the battle, Sly flees and the A.P.N.G. rests knowing another wave is soon to come. Gabriel, observing the battle from New-Gen, holds up several glowing green orbs full of nanobots. Sly, determined to destroy the A.P.N.G. finds machines built by the natives of the new world. He uses his microbots to take over the machines and turn them into larger, more powerful MetalMites. As the twins' visions become more and more clear, they complain of pain and discomfort as their bodies begin to change, alarming their parents as well as Gabriel who is watching them from New-Gen. .

During the battle, the A.P.N.G. show signs of victory until Sly shoots them all with a specialized radiation, destroying all of the nanobots in their bodies, reverting them to their human forms and taking away their powers. Just as Sly is about to finish the A.P.N.G. off, Gabriel teleports to the battle wielding his Kane. He gives the A.P.N.G. the green orbs, containing nanobots that will heal the A.P.N.G. and restore their super-powered forms.   As the members A.P.N.G. fight the giant machines, Gabriel battles Sly. The two former friends fight brutally, landing crushing blows and unleashing powerful energy bolts against each other. Eventually, Gabriel and the A.P.N.G. overcome Sly and his forces, but Gabriel decides to again spare Sly, saying he is not ready to finish off his old friend.

NEW-GEN: New Dawn
In 2011, A.P.N.G. Enterprises launched their second series, NEW-GEN: New Dawn. The series' recounts the origin of Gabriel, the manifestation of his abilities, and his arrival in NEW-GEN.
 
Gabriel, at the time known as Gabriam, resides in Ancient Egypt as the son of the Pharaoh. Because he displays a high aptitude for alchemy, Pharaoh entrusts Gabriam's education to the nation's most prominent scientists, led by master alchemist, Soeet. Under their tutelage, Gabriam excels and his abilities quickly surpass those of the men assigned to instruct him. This level of genius, combined with his royal status, causes Gabriam to become pompous, challenging his teachers and using his talents to create ostentatious displays. Gabriam's behavior captures the attention of Soeet, who resents his condescending remarks and doubts his suitability as the future pharaoh. With aide from his fellow scientists, Soeet plots to murder the boy by poisoning his drink at his nightly dinner with Pharaoh.

That evening, Pharaoh expresses pride in his son, but implores him to act with greater humility and compassion. Angered by the criticisms, Gabriam storms out of the palace, leaving Pharaoh to dine alone and drink from the poisoned cup. Gabriam is mysteriously transported to Pharaoh's side, but his powers cannot heal his father. With his dying breath, Pharaoh begs Gabriam to continue to make him proud and passes him his scepter, which glows and transforms into a new shape in his hands.

Years pass and Gabriam, now acting as pharaoh, is plagued with doubts about his leadership. As Egypt stands on the brink of war with a neighboring nation, his advisors urge him to act aggressively, while he prefers to keep the peace. As he ponders the gravity of the situation, the ghost of Pharaoh suddenly appears before him and announces he has used the magic of his scepter, which he refers to as "the Kane", to pause time and reconnect with his son. He addresses Gabriam's questions about the Kane, explaining that it was constructed using an early form of nanotechnology by an ancient, highly advanced alien civilization called the Nephesh. Intended to journey the universe collecting information about distant civilizations, the Kane fell to Earth where it was discovered by a wanderer. Pharaoh reveals that he was the wanderer who made the discovery, and that the Kane granted him superhuman abilities, including enhanced speed, strength, and the ability to slow his aging. He recounts his discovery of Gabriam as an infant, abandoned in the palace courtyard, and how the Kane responded to and bonded with the baby. He concludes, telling Gabriam his abilities are derived from the Kane and that it will lead him to his destiny of creating a utopia. As the ghost of Pharaoh vanishes, an advisor enters the throne room to spread word that negotiations have failed and the enemy's troops are rapidly approaching. Gabriam charges to the city gates to address the general, but is attacked upon arrival. To protect himself and his people, he harnesses the power of the Kane to launch a massive attack that annihilates the army.  Although acting in self-defense, Gabriam laments the loss of life and begins a journey to gain control of his abilities. He uses the Kane to create a portal, allowing him to travel into the future, and places him in a dark cavern which seems familiar, but he cannot recall how.

Gabriam continues deeper into the cave, where he is attacked by a powerful demonic figure. While fighting the demon, he inquires what he has done to incur his assailant's wrath. The creature insists that he has destroyed his life, which perplexes Gabriam, certain they have never met. As he grows weary in the struggle, the Kane creates a portal, allowing him to escape. The dimensional jump places him in a lush, beautiful world, NEW-GEN, where he is greeted by a young man named Deadalus. Gabriam immediately feels comfortable with the stranger, and the two quickly become friends. Seeing an opportunity to use his abilities to improve the newfound realm, Gabriam sets up a laboratory, and takes on Deadalus as an apprentice. Together, the two men progress their research and create a revolutionary form of nanotechnology capable of transforming organic matter on a molecular level. Deadalus brainstorms how their discoveries can heal the sick, while Gabriam shows caution and fears negative effects that may come along with its use.

As time goes by, Gabriam grows more powerful due to the Kane being strengthened through exposure to the nanobots. Gabriam continues to work alongside Deadalus and enters a relationship with the beautiful and compassionate Thea, one of NEW-GEN's caretakers.

Deadalus requests Gabriam's presence to display the nanobot's immense potential, enhancing NEW-GEN's landscape and revitalizing the world's plant life. Gabriam expresses his gratitude and commends his apprentice's vision, and Deadalus retorts that if he is truly appreciative, he will allow him to use their discoveries to heal his sick wife, Kallius. Gabriam refuses, claiming the nanobots aren't stable enough for human trials, and past experimentation on Kallius have progressed her condition. As they quarrel, Deadalus is alerted that his wife has taken a turn for the worse. He rushes to Kallius' side where she bids him farewell and asks him to look after their infant daughter, Carmen. Once again, Deadalus begs his mentor to intervene, but it's too late. Mourning his loss, Deadalus becomes consumed with grief and resentment toward Gabriam.

NEW-GEN: Deadalus Rising
Currently, there are plans for the NEW-GEN franchise to expand to film. NEW-GEN: DEADALUS RISING is a 3D CGI animated film  that continues the story established in the first volume of the NEW-GEN comic book. The film follows twins, Chris and Sean, and Carmen, as they try to protect Earth and NEW-GEN from Deadalus' plans for vengeance.

Characters
Gabriel- Gabriel was born in ancient Egypt as the son of the Pharaoh and possessed a genius-level understanding of science, particularly alchemy. Following the death of his father, Gabriam ascended to the role of Pharaoh, before beginning a journey across the universe to achieve balance and gain control over his abilities, ultimately leading him to New-Gen. Gabriel is the foremost scientist in New-Gen when it comes to nanotechnology. His knowledge of science and the practical applications of nanotechnology have helped him lead New-Gen to a new era, causing many to see him as father of New-Gen's prosperous new age. Due to his patriarchal nature, he constantly strives to make the universe a safer, more harmonious place, but is fiercely combative when those he cares about are in danger. He took in the infected children of New-Gen, feeling a great deal of responsibility for their mutations. He is capable of making very difficult decisions, which causes rifts between him and his wife on numerous occasions. His Kane grants him immense control over nanotechnology, affording him superhuman strength, the ability to form energy blasts and allowing him to bend the fabric of time and space itself.
Deadalus-Born on New-Gen after Gabriel had already arrived and begun his work, Deadalus grew up to eventually become one of Gabriel's greatest proteges. Together the two made scientific advancements, particularly in nanotechnology, but had a falling out after Gabriel refused to allow Deadalus to use their discoveries to save his terminally ill wife because of doubts about its suitability for human trials. Following his wife's death, Deadalus began experimenting to make the inhabitants of New-Gen "perfect,"  invulnerable citizens and becomes enraged when Gabriel seeks to stop him, believing his experiments are unethical. Gabriel is victorious in their battle and banishes Deadalus from NEW-GEN to the Under¬world dimension, which he quickly makes his base of operations. After discovering MetalMites and mircobots, which he controls through mental force, Deadalus takes control of the destructive technology. His self-afflicted microbot infection drives him towards a more bestial state of consciousness and physically transforms him into a demonic being. .
Thea-Also born on New-Gen, Thea was one of the powerful caretakers for the natural world of New-Gen before Gabriel arrived. Thea's levitation and clairvoyant abilities make her a formidably powerful match for Gabriel. She is strong willed and passionate in her actions, but possesses a motherly instinct. The two soon fell in love and with each of their individual talents, found a way to balance the natural world of NEW-GEN with the technological advances Gabriel made to also improve the world. The decision to send their sons, Sean and Chris, to Earth is a source of constant conflict between the two powerful beings. Thea even leaves for a time to return to her former home. Eventually, however, she returns to take over the co-tutelage of the children of NEW-GEN at A.P.N.G. Headquarters.
Sean and Chris-Sean and Chris are twin brothers, the children of Gabriel and Thea. The two of them were sent to Earth as babies, under the care of robot parents to keep them safe from Deadalus when he unleashed his nanites upon New-Gen. The two boys know northing of their origins, their true parents or their true place of birth. Whether the two of them grow to have any Nanopowers like the rest of the A.P.N.G. remains to be conclusively seen, but they have vivid visions of the battle on Zaadar III between the A.P.N.G. and Sly.
Nate Guard-A sentient robot constructed by Gabriel under the watchful eye of Thea, Nature Guardian or Nate Guard, was built to monitor New-Gen's electro-magnetosphere and the precise balance of the nanobots and technology that currently works in concert with the natural environment of New-Gen. If there are problems with either, he fixes it or alerts the A.P.N.G. if he finds the issue to be beyond an everyday occurrence. His sentience, which allows him to gather more information beyond that which is pertinent to his primary directive, gives him an insatiable curiosity. He asks constant questions on the nature of everything, much to the annoyance of other members of the A.P.N.G. He is able to alter his shape, adapting to the situation he presently finds himself in, making him a mechanical analogue to Darwin from the X-Men.
Mini-Minotaur was only a little older than the other children when he was infected by Deadalus's nanobots and mutated into a bull-headed humanoid with hoofed feet. He has a staunch and aggressive temperament, much like that of a real bull. He has a nasty temper, but remains a stalwart and loyal companion to his friends. He serves as the drill sergeant and de facto field leader for the A.P.N.G. He is often the first member of the team dispatched by Gabriel in many combat situations. His mutation gave him, in addition to a physically altered body, highly increased strength and durability, which he uses to his advantage in battle when running headlong into enemies with his sharp horns.
Roboduck- A first generation combat robot from New-Gen, Roboduck is equipped with several plasma-based weapons systems. In addition to arm mounted plasma cannons, and rocket enabled flight, he has the ability to fire an extremely powerful plasma blast from his mouth, in a "burping" fashion. Roboduck was affected in a very bizarre way by Deadalus' nanobots that mutated the children of New-Gen. Instead of changing Roboduck physically and granting him extra powers, they transformed Roboduck's programming, causing him to behave in a manner much more similar to a human than a machine. This in turn, makes Roboduck the most truly sentient of all robots on New-Gen, as he is able to feel emotion, disobey orders, improvise, develop a sense of humor, and act the part of class clown with the rest of the A.P.N.G.
Diamond-With a body composed of a diamond-like material, Diamond's body appears to be one of the strongest materials discovered on New-Gen. He is nearly invulnerable and possesses limited superhuman strength. He is devoted to martial arts training and seeks northing short of perfection for himself, physically as well as mentally. He is highly intelligent and intuitive and has a quick sense of humor and friendly temperament, which is balanced by his extremely strict self-discipline.
Flyer-Flyer's Nanopowers give him the ability to fly with large brown bat-like wings. He's driven by a competitive spirit to prove he's just as good if not better than all the others who have slightly stronger mutations. His competitive spirit is most often tested against Gazelle, who routinely gives him a run for his money. His cocky, sometimes arrogant attitude is tempered by a fierce loyalty to his friends and an eagerness to prove himself as a force to be reckoned with.
Gazelle-Gazelle's mutation transformed her into a humanoid creature appearing similar to her namesake, with two long horns, fur, hoofed feet and an elongated snout. The nanobots also afforded her with tremendous speed and agility, which more than make up for the fact that her martial arts skills leave much to be desired. She often expresses jealousy towards her friends who look more human than she does, but on the whole is a very caring and nurturing figure. She continually competes with Flyer, one of her best friends.
Carmen-The youngest of the A.P.N.G. and daughter of Deadalus, Carmen works extra hard to prove herself to compensate for her dark legacy. She wants to make sure that everyone knows her as her own, capable formidable person, instead of the daughter of a supercriminal. Since her father was banished, she was taken in by Gabriel and Thea like many other children and always strives to do her best in order to remind everyone, she is far more than her father's daughter.

Creators
New-Gen is created by J.D. Matonti, Julia Coppola, and Chris Matonti.The artist for the comic is Abdul Rashid.

Expanding into other media
A New-Gen animated series with Lena Headey, Luke Wilson, Finn Wolfhard and Anya Chalotra has been announced. 
New-Gen is a transmedia global brand that plans to extend into Motion Comics, Mobile Games, CGI Feature Films, Television Series, Video Games, Toys and Merchandising.
A.P.N.G. Enterprises announced the development of a NEW-GEN movie, written by Alison Wilgus, to star Mark Hamill.
A.P.N.G. also announced the development of motion comics developed and distributed by Visionbooks.

References

Marvel Comics titles